The Choir Schools' Association is a U.K. organisation that provides support to choir schools and choristers, and promotes singing, in particular of music for Christian worship in the cathedral tradition.  It represents 44 choir schools attached to cathedrals, churches, and college chapels.

The association was founded in 1918, although it represents some schools that are centuries older than this.  Today it provides bursaries and scholarships to 120 children at any one time to pursue training as choristers, primarily through the Chorister Fund established in 1985.  It also supports schools directly.  Katharine, Duchess of Kent, is a patron of the association.

Members
The following schools, cathedrals, and churches are members of the Choir School Association in 2020:

England 
Blackburn Cathedral
Bristol Cathedral Choir School
Chapel Royal, Hampton Court
Chetham's School of Music, Manchester
Chorister School, Durham
Christ Church Cathedral School, Oxford
City of London School
Croydon Minster
Dean Close Preparatory School, Cheltenham
Frideswide Voices, Oxford
Hereford Cathedral School
King's Ely
King's College School, Cambridge
King's Rochester Preparatory School, Kent
King's School, Worcester
Lanesborough School, Guildford
Leicester Cathedral
Lichfield Cathedral School
Lincoln Cathedral
Lincoln Minster School
London Oratory School
Magdalen College School, Oxford
New College School, Oxford
Norwich School
Old Palace School, Croydon
Portsmouth Grammar School
Queen Elizabeth Grammar School, Wakefield
Reigate St Mary's Preparatory and Choir School
Ripon Cathedral
Runnymede St Edward's School, Liverpool
St Cedd's School, Essex
St Edmund's School Canterbury
St Edward's College, Liverpool
St George's School, Windsor Castle
St John's College School, Cambridge
St Nicholas Cathedral, Newcastle upon Tyne
St Paul's Cathedral School, London
St Peter's Collegiate Church, Wolverhampton
Salisbury Cathedral School
Sheffield Cathedral
The Cathedral School, Exeter
The King's School, Gloucester
The King's School, Peterborough
The Minster School, Southwell
The Minster School, York
The Pilgrims' School, Winchester
The Prebendal School, Chichester
Truro School
Wells Cathedral School
Westminster Abbey Choir School
Westminster Cathedral Choir School
Whitgift School, Croydon

Ireland 
St Patrick's Cathedral Choir School, Dublin

New Zealand 
The Cathedral Grammar School, Christchurch, New Zealand

Scotland 
St Mary's Music School, Edinburgh

United States 
Saint Thomas Choir School, New York

Wales 
The Cathedral School, Llandaff
St John's College, Cardiff

External links
 The Choir Schools' Association website

References

 
Educational organisations based in the United Kingdom
Music organisations based in the United Kingdom